Heath or heathland is low-growing woody vegetation, mostly consisting of heathers and related species.

Heath or heathland may also refer to:

Butterflies and moths
the heaths, common name for the Palearctic species of the genus Coenonympha, brush-footed butterflies 
Coenonympha pamphilus (small heath), a butterfly native to Europe, Asia except tropical India and Indochina, and Northern Africa 
Coenonympha tullia (large heath), a butterfly native to Europe, Asia except tropical India and Indochina, and North America 
Melitaea athalia (heath fritillary), a butterfly found throughout the Palaearctic from western Europe to Japan
Semiothisa clathrata (latticed heath), a moth found from Europe, North Africa and Asia

Plants
Heath family or heather family, Ericaceae
Australian heath, any of the species in the genus Epacris
Beard heath, any of the species in the genus Leucopogon
Heath, many of the species in the genus Cassiope
Heath, either of the two species in the genus Daboecia
Heath, many of the species in the genus Erica
Mountain heath, any of the species in the genus Phyllodoce

Places

Ireland
Heathland, County Westmeath, a townland in the civil parish of Lackan, barony of Corkaree

United Kingdom
Heath, Cardiff, Wales
Heath (electoral ward), in Cardiff
Heath, Derbyshire, England
Heath, Herefordshire
The Heath, Buxton with Lammas, a location in Norfolk
 The Heath (Hampstead Heath), a park in the City of London
The Heath, Hevingham, a location in Norfolk
The Heath, North Norfolk, a location in Fakenham, Norfolk
Heath, Shropshire
The Heath, Staffordshire
The Heath, Suffolk, a location near Tattingstone
Ipswich Heaths, Suffolk
Heath, West Midlands
Heath, West Yorkshire

United States
Heath, Alabama
Heath, Indiana
Heath, Kentucky
Heath, Massachusetts
Heath Township, Michigan
Heath, Montana
Heath, Ohio
Heath Township, Jefferson County, Pennsylvania
Heath, Texas

People
Heath (name), a list of people with the forename or surname
Heath (musician) (Hiroshi Morie, born 1968), Japanese musician
Heath Brothers, an American jazz band

Art, entertainment, and media
HEATH, an experimental literary text by Tan Lin
Heath, a fictional character in the American television series The Walking Dead
Heath Swanson, a fictional character in the Japanese manga series California Story

Companies
 Allen & Heath, a manufacturer of audio mixing consoles, based in Penryn, Cornwall, UK
 D. C. Heath and Company, a publishing company in Lexington, Massachusetts, US
 Heath Ceramics, a manufacturer of ceramic tableware and tiles in Sausalito, California, US
 Heathkit, also known as Heath Company, a manufacturer of electronic kits and devices

Schools
 Heath Elementary School (disambiguation)
 Heath Grammar School, Halifax, West Yorkshire, England
 Heath High School (Kentucky), US (closed in 2013)
 Heath High School (Ohio), US

Other uses
Heath v. Alabama, 478 U.S. 82 (1985), interpreting the double jeopardy clause of the Fifth Amendment to the Constitution of the United States
Heath bar, a confection
Heath Robinson (codebreaking machine), a codebreaking machine used by the British in the Second World War
Heath Robinson, used to describe an implausibly complex and impractical contraption, named after the cartoons of such machines by W Heath Robinson
The Heath GAA, a Gaelic football club in County Laois, Ireland

See also
Heather (disambiguation)
Heathrow (disambiguation)
Heath (list of places), list of places with "Heath" in their name